Amarshi Kasba is a census town in Patashpur I CD block in Egra subdivision of Purba Medinipur district in the state of West Bengal, India.

History
Binoy Ghosh notes that during the Muslim rule, the word 'Kasba', meaning human settlement, was attached to the names of many villages. Kasba-i-Amarshi was one of them. There is a popular folklore about the place. There was once a king named Amar Singh. He was very oppressive and did not even treat his subjects as human beings. He also was a Muslim-hater. At the entrance gate of his palace, a footwear of his was hung, the objective being that visitors to the palace would first show respect to the footwear and then enter the palace. Towards the end of the 17th century, Makdum Saheb of the Chishti Order was visiting Bengal. One day, he came to visit the king, and as usual was asked to show respect to the footwear hung at the gate. He refused and a fight ensued, in which not only the guards, but also the king was killed. The news of Makdum Saheb's bravery spread fast and the oppressed subjects felt relieved.

Geography

CD block HQ
The headquarters of Patashpur I CD block are located at Amarshi Kasba.

Urbanisation
96.96% of the population of Egra subdivision live in the rural areas. Only 3.04% of the population live in the urban areas, and that is the lowest proportion of urban population amongst the four subdivisions in Purba Medinipur district.

Note: The map alongside presents some of the notable locations in the subdivision. All places marked in the map are linked in the larger full screen map.

Demographics
As per 2011 Census of India Amarshi Kasba had a total population of 6,400 of which 3,275 (51%) were males and 3,125 (49%) were females. Population below 6 years was 835. The total number of literates in Amarshi Kasba was 4,306 (77.38% of the population over 6 years).

Infrastructure
As per the District Census Handbook 2011, Amarshi Kasba covered an area of 0.8253 km2. It had the facility of a railway station at Balichak 52 km away and bus routes in the town. Amongst the civic amenities it had 10 road lighting points and 350 domestic electric connections. Amongst the medical facilities it had a hospital 3 km away and 11 medicine shops in the town. Amongst the educational facilities it had were 6 primary schools, 2 secondary schools and 1 senior secondary school. The nearest degree college was at Palpara 10 km away. Amongst the recreational and cultural facilities, a public library and a reading room were there in the town.

Transport
The Egra-Patashpur-Amarshi-Bhagabanpur-Bajkul Road passes through Amarshi Kasba.

Education
The nearest degree college, Yogoda Satsanga Palpara Mahavidyalaya at Palpara, was established in 1964.

Healthcare
Gonara Block Primary Health Centre at Golara Nij, PO Manglamaro (with 10 beds), the main medical facility in Patashpur I CD block, is located nearby.

References

Cities and towns in Purba Medinipur district